Sidorovo is a rural locality (a selo) and the administrative center of Sidorovskoye Rural Settlement, Gryazovetsky District, Vologda Oblast, Russia. The population was 645 as of 2002. There are 7 streets.

Geography 
Sidorovo is located 50 km southeast of Gryazovets (the district's administrative centre) by road. Bakshino is the nearest rural locality.

References 

Rural localities in Gryazovetsky District